Dipterocypsela is a genus of flowering plants in the daisy family.

There is only one known species, Dipterocypsela succulenta, endemic to the Magdalena region of Colombia.

References

Monotypic Asteraceae genera
Endemic flora of Colombia
Vernonieae